The Borumba Dam is a rock-fill embankment dam with an un-gated spillway located across the Yabba Creek in the Wide Bay–Burnett region of Queensland, Australia. The main purposes of the dam are for irrigation and potable water supply. The resultant impounded reservoir is called Lake Borumba.

Location and features
Constructed in 1964, Borumba Dam is a popular destination for recreational fishers.

The dam is managed by Seqwater. In 1980 Ern Grant B.Sc. M.Sc. of Ern Grants Guide to Fishes fame was instrumental in setting up a Freshwater Fish Hatchery at Borumba. The Hatchery is no longer in operation. The Borumba Hatchery used to boast display tanks displaying large Saratoga and Golden Perch and it was quite a tourist attraction. During 2008 and 2009 the dam wall was raised by another . The second upgrade was intended to allow better management of extreme rainfall events.

According to a local councillor the spillway developed a crack after an earthquake on 1 December 1991.

In August 2021 the Queensland Government announced $22m in funding for analysis of a proposed pumped hydro-electric project, utilising a new dam built above Borumba Dam.

Recreation
A range of recreation activities are permitted at Borumba Dam including boating (powered and non-powered), canoeing and kayaking, water skiing and jet skiing, fishing, camping, and walking. Picnic  and  barbeque facilities are available.

Naturally occurring blue-green algae blooms sometimes mean Seqwater closes access to the dam's water for public safety purposes.

See also

List of dams in Queensland
Stuart Gatehouse, whose remains were found in the lake

References

External links
Borumba Dam Fishing Information, Map, pictures & Water Level Gauge
Pictures- National Library of Australia

Reservoirs in Queensland
Dams completed in 1964
Wide Bay–Burnett
Mary River (Queensland)
Dams in Queensland
Dams completed in 1963
Embankment dams
Rock-filled dams